Calvin P. Pokiak (born May 28, 1955, Tuktoyaktuk, Northwest Territories, Canada) is a Canadian engineer, a former civil servant, and a current municipal and territorial level politician.

Pokiak first became a politician on the municipal level serving as a councilor on the Hamlet of Tuktoyaktuk council. He later served as mayor for the community.

Pokiak ran for a seat 2003 Northwest Territories general election. He won the Nunakput electoral district defeating incumbent Vince Steen. He was  defeated in his bid for re-election to a second term in the 2007 Northwest Territories general election. He came last in a field of four candidates.

References

External links
Official Biography

1955 births
Living people
Members of the Legislative Assembly of the Northwest Territories
Inuit politicians
Inuit from the Northwest Territories
21st-century Canadian politicians